The "Rotterdam Rules" (formally, the United Nations Convention on Contracts for the International Carriage of Goods Wholly or Partly by Sea) is a treaty proposing new international rules to revise the legal framework for maritime affreightment and carriage of goods by sea. The Rules primarily address the legal relationship between carriers and cargo-owners.

The aim of the convention is to extend and modernize existing international rules and achieve uniformity of International trade law in the field of maritime carriage, updating or replacing many provisions in the Hague Rules, Hague-Visby Rules and Hamburg Rules. The convention establishes a comprehensive, uniform legal regime governing the rights and obligations of shippers, carriers and consignees under a contract for door-to-door shipments that involve international sea transport.

Although the final text was greeted with much enthusiasm, a decade later, little has happened. As of December 2018, the rules are not yet in force as they have been ratified by only four states, three of which are minor West African states. The Rotterdam Rules are extensive, with nearly ten times as many Articles as existing "tackle-to-tackle only" Rules. Although some have argued that the new Rules have flaws, the Hague-Visby Rules which dominate the sector are insufficient for modern multimodal transport. One possible way forward might be the interim adoption of a "Rotterdam-Lite Convention".

History
The Hague Rules of 1924 were updated in 1968 to become the Hague-Visby Rules, but the changes were modest. The modified convention still covered only "tackle to tackle" carriage contracts,  with no provision for multimodal transport. The industry-changing phenomenon of containerization was barely acknowledged. The 1978 Hamburg Rules were introduced to provide a framework that was both more modern, and less biased in favour of ship operators. Although the Hamburg Rules were readily adopted by developing countries, the new convention was shunned by richer countries who stuck with Hague and  Hague-Visby. It had been expected that a Hague/Hamburg compromise might arise, but instead the vast (96 articles) Rotterdam Rules appeared.

The final draft of the Rotterdam Rules, which was assembled by the United Nations Commission on International Trade Law, was adopted by the United Nations on 11 December 2008, and a signing ceremony was held in Rotterdam on 23 September 2009. Signatories included the United States, France, Greece, Denmark, Switzerland and the Netherlands; in all, signatures were obtained from countries said to make up 25 percent of world trade by volume. Signatures were allowed after the ceremony at the U.N. Headquarters in New York City, United States.

The World Shipping Council is a prominent supporter of the Rotterdam Rules. In 2010, the American Bar Association House of Delegates approved a resolution supporting U.S. ratification of the Rotterdam Rules.

Main provisions
The following are critical provisions and law changes found in the Rotterdam Rules:
 The Rules apply only if the carriage includes a sea leg; other multimodal carriage contracts which have no sea leg are outside of the scope of the Rules.
 It extends the period that carriers are responsible for goods, to cover the time between the point where the goods are received to the point where the goods are delivered.
 It allows for more e-commerce and approves more forms of electronic documentation.
 It increases the limit liability of carriers to 875 units of account per shipping unit or three units of account per kilogram of gross weight.
 It eliminates the "nautical fault defence" which had protected carriers and crew from liability for negligent ship management and navigation.
 It extends the time that legal claims can be filed to two years following the day the goods were delivered or should have been delivered.
 It allows parties to so-called "Volume Contracts" to opt-out of some liability rules set in the convention.
 It obliges carriers to keep ships seaworthy and properly crewed throughout the voyage. The standard of care is not "strict", but "due diligence" (as with the Hague Rules).

Entry into force and ratifications
The Rotterdam Rules will enter into effect a year after 20 countries have ratified that treaty. As of 9 August 2011, there were 24 signatories to the treaty. The most recent country to sign the treaty was Sweden, which signed on 20 July 2011. Spain was the first country to ratify the convention in January 2011. An overview of signatures and ratifications is shown below:

Upon entry into force of the convention for a country, it should denounce the conventions governing the Hague-Visby Rules as well as the Hamburg Rules as the convention does not come into effect without such denouncements.

See also
 Hague-Visby Rules
 Hamburg Rules
 Seaworthiness (law)

References

External links
 ratifications

Admiralty law treaties
Treaties concluded in 2009
Treaties not entered into force
Treaties of the Republic of the Congo
Treaties of Spain
Treaties of Togo
United Nations treaties
2009 in the Netherlands
International trade law